Vincent Accettola (born March 23, 1994) is an American producer and arts administrator who previously served as Managing Director of the National Youth Orchestra of China.

Early life and education 
Accettola graduated from Yale University where he earned a BS in Neuroscience and Political Science and later Harvard University where he studied Education Policy & Management. While at Yale, he served as President of the Yale Undergraduate Screenwriters Guild.

Accettola currently attends the MBA/MFA dual degree program at New York University's Stern School of Business and Tisch School of the Arts.

Career 
As a senior at Yale University, Accettola collaborated with his roommate Owen Brown to create the National Youth Orchestra of China (NYO-China), a music festival modeled closely after the National Youth Orchestra of the United States of America (NYO-USA) with an annual residency and concert tour featuring over one hundred of the country's most outstanding young musicians.

With the support of Carnegie Hall and the Yale School of Music, Accettola and Brown launched the first season of NYO-China in 2017 with a sold-out concert at Carnegie Hall headlined by pianist Yuja Wang and conducted by Music Director of the Seattle Symphony Ludovic Morlot. The National Youth Orchestra of China since went on to become the premier youth ensemble in the country, having achieved critical acclaim in The New York Times, People’s Daily, and Der Tagesspiegel.

In his capacity as Managing Director of NYO-China, Accettola produced several live and recorded broadcasts of the orchestra for NPR, Medici.tv, ARTE, and CCTV. He also produced and co-directed the documentary 中国特色交响乐团: Orchestra with Chinese Characteristics alongside Academy Award-nominated filmmaker Christine Choy.

References

External links 
 Leadership Biography on NYO-China Official Website
 Interview on WQXR's Young Artist Showcase
 Interview on Shanghai TV's Music Tonight

1994 births
Living people
Yale College alumni
Harvard Graduate School of Education alumni
American people of Chinese descent
People from New York City
People from Syosset, New York
People from Colts Neck Township, New Jersey